The alismatid monocots are a group of 15 interrelated families of flowering plants, named for their largest order, Alismatales. Like other monocots, they usually have a single embryonic leaf (cotyledon) in their seeds, leaves with parallel veins, scattered vascular systems, flowers with parts in threes or multiples of three, and roots that can develop in more than one place along the stems. Plants in the alismatid grade have adapted to thrive in oceans, temperate zones, deserts, the tropics, and even glacial regions.

The alismatid monocots were the first orders to diverge from the other monocots, during the Cretaceous Period. Like the earliest monocots, many of them are aquatic, and some grow completely submerged. Apart from the sweet-flag family of wetlands plants, all the alismatid families are in Alismatales. Some of the plants in this order are invasive aquatic weeds that can disrupt and destabilize ecosystems. Others grow in a variety of habitats, especially the plants in the aroid family. This family includes the titan arum, with the world's largest unbranched inflorescence, and also the world's smallest flowering plant, duckweed. 

Legend

Alismatid families

See also

Notes

Citations

References
 
  See the terms of their Creative Commons license.
 
 
 
 
 See the terms of their license.
 
 
 
 

Systematic
Taxonomic lists (families)
Gardening lists
Lists of plants
Alismatales